Piriform Software Ltd is a British software company based in London, owned since 2017 by Avast which itself become part of NortonLifeLock (now Gen Digital) in 2022. The company develops cleaning and optimisation tools for Microsoft Windows, macOS and Android operating systems, including CCleaner, CCleaner Browser, Defraggler, Recuva and Speccy. On 22 September 2015, Piriform launched CCleaner Cloud, a tool to maintain computers remotely.

History 
The name Piriform means "shaped like a pear," possibly referring to the British slang "to go pear-shaped".

CCleaner was launched in 2004 by founders Guy Saner and Lindsey Whelan.

In July 2017, Piriform Ltd was acquired by Avast.

In September 2017, researchers discovered that CCleaner was compromised by hackers who inserted a backdoor into the software, enabling remote access to infected machines.

The malware was in version 5.33 of CCleaner, prior to the acquisition by Avast. Avast quickly fixed the vulnerability and required version 5.33 users to update immediately.

CCleaner

CCleaner is a computer cleaning software featuring MacOS and Windows versions. CCleaner has the option to clean computer browser software including Microsoft Edge, Internet Explorer, Google Chrome, and Firefox as well as a computer system's temporary files. It has a separate tab to clean the registry. (A potential backup of regedit is available.) CCleaner's other tools include editing and uninstalling programs, editing the operating system's startup apps and editing browser plugins. It can analyse hard disks individually to determine which files are taking the most space. It can search for duplicate files to help reduce drive storage space. It allows one to quickly access system restore points, and it can wipe clean the free space on individual drives to completely remove deleted files. In addition, CCleaner can automatically update computer software and drivers.

CCleaner has its own web browser called CCleaner Browser. CCleaner Browser is included to optionally install in the CCleaner installer, but it can also be installed from its website. CCleaner Browser blocks online advertisements, avoids tracking, has built-in security against malware, phishing, malicious downloads, and also avoids potentially unwanted elements like pop-ups or excessive browser cache. The browser is only available for Microsoft Windows.

CCleaner also develops a tool called Kamo, which feeds trackers fake information to help stop a 'digital fingerprint' (a unique fingerprint that can be used to identify and track people) from being created. It supposedly makes websites and advertisers less able to show targeted ads, recommendations and price increases.

References 

 
Software companies of England
Companies based in the London Borough of Camden
2004 establishments in the United Kingdom
2017 mergers and acquisitions
Software companies established in 2004
Companies established in 2004
British subsidiaries of foreign companies
Avast
Gen Digital acquisitions